Bam Pasht District is a district (bakhsh) in Saravan County, Sistan and Baluchestan province, Iran. At the 2006 census, its population was 27,221, in 6,228 families. At the 2016 census, its population was 25,026. The district has one city: Sirkan. The district has two rural districts (dehestan): Bam Pasht Rural District and Keshtegan Rural District.

References 

Saravan County
Districts of Sistan and Baluchestan Province
Populated places in Saravan County